The Alto de la Alianza Monumental Complex is a historical monument and landmark complex in the south of Peru, near the city of Tacna.

The monument is located in the site of the Battle of Tacna, a battle that took place on May 26, 1880 between the allied Bolivian and Peruvian forces against the Chilean Army that resulted in the alliance's retreat and the loss of their strongholds in Arica and Tacna, as well as a period known locally as the captivity of Tacna, part of the larger Chilean–Peruvian territorial dispute that lasted about 50 years.

Overview
The site is on the Intiorko hill plateau, surrounded by sand and sempervivum plants. It houses a monument in homage to the combatants of the battle. The arch generated by the set of volumes oriented on the east-west axis symbolizes the alliance of the armies of Peru and Bolivia; and its elements or blocks represent the different battalions or contingents that came from both countries.

The volume of stones reflects the direction of the Chilean attack and symbolizes the force that it exerted. The curve, generated by the volumes in opposition to the direction of the stones, symbolizes the battle and the succession of higher plates pointing south, expresses the resistance of the city of Tacna.

Complex
In 1979, the military government presided over by Francisco Morales Bermúdez determined the construction of a large monumental complex, located on the plain to the northeast of Intiorko hill; The project and construction of the monument were under the direction of architect Enrique Vargas Giles and engineer Jorge Espinoza Cáceres respectively and the sculptural part was assumed by Holger Carpio Deztre.

Museum

The Campo de la Alianza Site Museum is a war museum located under the Alto de la Alianza monument, it was inaugurated on May 26, 1982.

Monument
The monument features the previously described arch feature and ornate surroundings, as well as a cemetery in its vicinity with over 700 crosses representing the regiments and individuals that fought and were killed in action during the battle.

The monument is also accompanied by eight stainless steel sculptures created by the artist Holguer Caprio Dextre, with the purpose of resisting the environment of the area, and as a modern technique that has allowed advances and sculptural boasts. The set summarizes actions and attitudes of the history of the city of Tacna, heroism, resurgence and projection into the future.

Gallery

See also
Cultural heritage of Peru

References

Bibliography

Revolutionary Government of the Armed Forces of Peru
Buildings and structures in Tacna Region
History of Peru
Monuments and memorials in Peru
Cultural heritage of Peru